Artashes Stepani Chilingarian better known as Ruben Darbinian ( 1883-1968) was an Armenian politician and activist in the Armenian Revolutionary Federation (ARF) and for a brief period, Justice minister during the First Republic of Armenia . He was also a renowned contributor and editor in a number of Armenian publications in Tbilisi, Baku, Istanbul and Boston and a well-known political writer.

Biography
Chilingarian was born in Akhalkalak in Georgia's southern region of Samtskhe-Javakheti. After his studies in the Russian Secondary School in Tbilisi, the Georgian capital, he continued his studies in universities in Heidelberg and Munich, eventually graduating from the Faculty of Law in Moscow.

Politically active in the ARF, he contributed to a number of prominent Armenian publications like Mshak and Murdj. Pursued by the Russian tsarist authorities, he sought asylum in Constantinople in 1909 where he continued to contribute to the prominent Azatamart Armenian newspaper.

In 1913, he moved to Germany and in order to avoid further suspicions from the German intelligence, he applied for a passport under the alias of Ruben Darbinian (in Western Armenian Roupen Tarpinian). Chilingarian continued using the new name from thereon until his death. In Berlin, he founded the Armenian-German Society.

In 1914, he returned to the Caucasus and resided in Tbilisi and Baku. He was editor of Arev in Baku from 1914 to 1916 and starting 1917 in Gordz, an Armenian monthly. In 1917, he became the secretary of the Armenian National Council that worked for the independence of Armenia.

With the establishment of the Republic of Armenia, he moved to Yerevan and served as Minister of Justice of the First Republic of Armenia from spring 1920 until the collapse of the republic with the onslaught of the Red Army. He was arrested soon after during the purge of Armenian nationalists with the establishment of communist rule.

Darbinian was freed during the short February Uprising in 1921 against the communists, and soon after moved to Tehran, Persia and later to the United States, where he resided in Boston, Massachusetts, becoming the editor of ARF's Hairenik daily and monthly.

He continued his activism and published his memoirs and a number of studies documenting events in the First Republic of Armenia and the later Armenian Soviet Socialist Republic, particularly under the Leninist and Stalinist eras. He died in Boston in 1968.

See also 
The Russian Threat

References 

1883 births
1968 deaths
Armenian nationalists
People of the First Republic of Armenia
Armenian Revolutionary Federation politicians
Armenian Ministers of Justice
Armenian anti-communists
Soviet emigrants to the United States